Engelmann may refer to:
 Engelmann Oak, also called Pasadena Oak
 Engelmann Spruce, a medium-sized evergreen tree
 Engelmann syndrome, a rare autosomal dominant genetic disorder

Engelmann is the surname of:
 Eduard Engelmann Jr. (1864–1944), Austrian figure skater, engineer, and cyclist
 Fabien Engelmann (1979–), French politician
 Franklin Engelmann (1908–1972), British radio personality, popular 1950s and 1960s
 George Engelmann (1809–1884), German-American botanist
 George Julius Engelmann (1847–1903), American obstetrician and gynecologist
 Godefroy Engelmann (1788–1839), Franco-German lithographer
 Helene Engelmann (1898–1985), Austrian figure skater
 Hugo O. Engelmann (1917–2002), American sociologist, anthropologist and general systems theorist
 Johannes Engelmann (1832–1912), Baltic German jurist
 Paul Engelmann (1891–1965), Jewish-Austrian architect
 Peter Engelmann (1823–1874), German American educationist and writer
 Theodor Wilhelm Engelmann (1843–1909), German botanist, physiologist, microbiologist, university professor, and musician
 Thorsten Engelmann (b. 1981), German rower

See also 
 Engelman
 Engel (disambiguation)
 Engels (disambiguation)

German-language surnames
Germanic-language surnames
Jewish surnames
Ethnonymic surnames